Objective idealism is a form of metaphysical idealism that accepts Naïve realism (the view that empirical objects exist objectively) but rejects epiphenomenalist materialism (according to which the mind and spiritual values have emerged due to material causes), as opposed to subjective idealism denies that material objects exist independently of human perception and thus stands opposed to both realism and naturalism. 

The philosopher Charles Sanders Peirce stated his own version of objective idealism in the following manner:

The one intelligible theory of the universe is that of objective idealism, that matter is effete mind, inveterate habits becoming physical laws (Peirce, CP 6.25).

A. C. Ewing is an analytic philosopher influenced by the objective idealist tradition. His approach has been termed analytic idealism.

Notable proponents
Charles Sanders Peirce
Josiah Royce
A. C. Ewing

Notes

References
 
 Paul Guyer, "Absolute idealism and the rejection of Kantian dualism", Ch. 2 of The Cambridge Companion to German Idealism, ed. by Karl Ameriks. 
 Peirce, C. S. (1891), "The Architecture of Theories", The Monist vol. 1, no. 2 (January 1891), pp. 161–176. Internet Archive The Monist vol. 1, page 161. Reprinted in Collected Papers of Charles Sanders Peirce, vol. 6 (1935), paragraphs 7–34, and in The Essential Peirce, vol. 1 (1992), pp. 285–297).
 Peirce, C. S., Collected Papers of Charles Sanders Peirce, vols. 1–6, Charles Hartshorne and Paul Weiss (eds.), vols. 7–8, Arthur W. Burks (ed.), Harvard University Press, Cambridge, MA, 1931–1935, 1958. (Cited as CP vol.para.)

Idealism
Metaphysical theories